Arttu Likola (born September 24, 1994) is a Finnish ice hockey player who plays as a left winger for SaiPa on loan from JYP Jyväskylä.

References

Living people
JYP Jyväskylä players
Finnish ice hockey left wingers
1994 births
Sportspeople from Jyväskylä
21st-century Finnish people